Dera Bassi is a satellite city of Chandigarh and a municipal council in Mohali district in the state of Punjab, India. Dera Bassi is located on the Chandigarh – Delhi National Highway, 8 km from Chandigarh. It is located within 20 km from Chandigarh, Mohali and Panchkula. It is strategically located near the boundary of Haryana, Punjab and Union territory of Chandigarh. Derabassi is most famous for its industrial belt, situated for the most part on Ramgarh and Barwala Road. The nearby sub town of Lalru was once a famous market for red chilli powder. The city and the nearby area host eight Engineering, B.Ed., Paramedical and Management institutes.

History
The Dera Bassi town was formed from the early Kalsia State, whose headquarters were at Chhachhrauli. There was a big fort of Mughal era located at outskirts of Dera Bassi. The fort still exists, albeit as a ruin. It was used as guest house by Kalsia rulers. In 1922, Ravi Sher Singh visited Dera Bassi after his paramount as the monarch of Kalsai state. Earlier the town was under Patiala district, thereafter it has become a part of newly created Mohali district.

In village named Makandpur in Dera Bassi, there is a holy place called "Kethlo Tirath" (Kamlon Third). There is Kunti Kund Sarovar (Pond), Temple of Pandavas with Lord Krishna and Lord Shiva. It is believed  that the Pandavas stayed at this place when they successfully escaped from Lakshagraha.

Geography and Ecology

Location
Derabassi is located near the foothills of the Sivalik range of the Himalayas in northwest India. It has an average elevation of 321 metres (1053 ft).

The city, lying in the northern plains, has vast fertile and flat land.  The surrounding cities are the union territory of Chandigarh, Mohali, Patiala, Zirakpur and Roopnagar in Punjab, Panchkula, and Ambala in Haryana.

Chandigarh is situated 119 km southwest of Shimla, 30 km (19 miles) northeast of Ambala, 236 km (148 miles) southeast of Amritsar and 230 km (144 miles) north of Delhi.

Climate

Derabassi has a humid subtropical climate (Köppen: Cwa) characterised by a seasonal rhythm: very hot summers, mild winters, unreliable rainfall and great variation in temperature (−1 °C to 46 °C OR 30.2 °F to 114 °F). The average annual rainfall is 1110.7 mm. The city also receives occasional winter rains from the Western Disturbance originating over the Mediterranean Sea.

The western disturbances usually brings rain predominantly from mid-December till end of April which can be heavier sometimes with strong winds and hails if the weather turns colder (during March–April months) which usually proves disastrous to the crops. Cold winds usually tend to come from the north near Shimla, capital of Himachal Pradesh and from the union territory Jammu and Kashmir, both of which receive their share of snowfall during wintertime.

The city experiences the following seasons and the respective average temperatures:
 Spring: The climate remains the most enjoyable part of the year during the spring season (from February-end to early-April). Temperatures vary between (max) 13 °C to 20 °C and (min) 5 °C to 12 °C.
 Autumn: In autumn (from September-end to mid November.), the temperature may rise to a maximum of 30 °C. Temperatures usually remain between 10° to 22° in autumn. The minimum temperature is around 6 °C.
 Summer: The temperature in summer (from mid-April to June-end) may rise to 44 °C. The temperatures might sometime rise to 44 °C in mid-June. Temperatures generally vary between 40 and 42 °C.
 Monsoon: During monsoon (from early-July to mid-September), Derabassi receives moderate to heavy rainfall and sometimes heavy to very heavy rainfall (generally during the month of August or September). Usually, the rain bearing monsoon winds blow from south-west/south-east. Mostly, the city receives heavy rain from south (which is mainly a persistent rain) but it generally receives most of its rain during monsoon either from North-west or North-east. Maximum amount of rain received by the city of Chandigarh during monsoon season is 195.5 mm in a single day.
 Winter: Winters (November-end to February-end) are mild but it can sometimes get quite chilly in Derabassi. Average temperatures in the winter remain at (max) 5 °C to 14 °C and (min) -1 °C to 5 °C. Rain usually comes from the west during winters and it is usually a persistent rain for 2–3 days with sometimes hailstorms. The city witnessed bone-numbing chill as the maximum temperature on Monday, 7 January 2013 plunged to a 30-year low to settle at 6.1 degrees Celsius.

Demographics
As of the 2001 India census, Dera Bassi had a population of 15,690. Males constitute 54% of the population and females 46%. Dera Bassi has an average literacy rate of 76%, higher than the national average of 59.5%: male literacy is 80% and, female literacy is 72%. In Dera Bassi, 13% of the population is under 6 years of age. Dera Bassi population of 2016 in 1,35,685.00

Places of interest

Derabassi is located very near to Chandigarh. Chandigarh has various visitor attractions including theme gardens within the city. Some notable sites are:

Sukhna Lake

Sukhna Lake is located in Sector 1, adjoining the Rock Garden near the foothills of Shivalik Hills. Sukhna is an artificial lake. This 3 km rain-fed lake was created in 1958 by damming the Sukhna Choe, a seasonal stream coming down from the Shivalik Hills. It has The Garden of Silence within it.

The atmosphere here is serene. Sukhna Lake is the venue for many festive celebrations. The most popular is the Mango Festival held during the monsoons. It is believed that a Swiss architect Pierre Jeanneret's ashes were immersed in this lake according to his will as he developed a deep bond with the lake.

Rock Garden

The Rock Garden is situated in the middle of the Capitol Complex and the Sukhna Lake in Sector 1. It is also known as Nek Chand Rock Garden after its founder. It has numerous sculptures made by using a variety of different discarded waste materials like frames, mudguards, forks, handle bars, metal wires, play marbles, porcelain, auto parts, broken bangles etc.

Nek Chand himself went up the Shivalik hills and got different stones and materials with which he started building the garden.

Rose Garden

Zakir Hussain Rose Garden, or simply Rose Garden, is named after the former President of India, Zakir Hussain. It is situated in Sector 16. The garden is known to be the greatest of its types in Asia.

The garden is said to be spread about thirty to forty acres containing nearly 825 varieties of roses in it and more than 32,500 varieties of other medicinal plants and trees.

Parrot Bird Sanctuary Chandigarh

Parrot Bird Sanctuary Chandigarh is a bird sanctuary which is located in sector 21 Chandigarh India. It is notified under Section 18 of the Wildlife (Protection) Act, 1972.  It is habitat of thousands of parrots. It is the second wildlife sanctuary in the city after Sukhna Wildlife Sanctuary.

Leisure Valley

A continuum of various theme gardens, Leisure Valley is a linear park over 8 km long which starts from Sector 1 in the north and leaves Chandigarh at its southernmost edge. It consists of many theme parks, botanical gardens and green belts, including Rajendra Park in Sector 1, the Bougainvillea Garden in Sector 3 and the Physical Fitness Trails in Sector 10, among others.

Other destinations

Other tourist destinations include The New Lake in Sector 42, Capitol Complex in Sector 1, City Centre in Sector 17, Open hand monument in Sector 1, Le Corbusier Centre in Sector 19, Government Museum and Art Gallery in Sector 10, International Doll Museum in Sector 23, Sree Chaitanya Gaudiya Math in Sector 20.

There are many tourist gardens like the Garden of Fragrance in Sector 36, Garden of Palms in Sector 42, Butterfly Park in Sector 26, Valley of Animals in Sector 49, the Japanese Garden in Sector 31 and the Terraced Garden in Sector 33. Several other famous tourist destinations like Pinjore Gardens, Morni Hills, Nada Sahib, Kasauli, Chhatbir Zoo lie in its vicinity.

Transport

Road

(CTU) operates public transport buses from Derabassi bus stand for ISBT 17, PGI, ISBT 43, Mansa Devi and Manimajra route. Local private buses also run for Lehli, Lalru, Barwala (Haryana) and others for Patiala, Jalandhar, Ambala etc. Haryana Roadways is also very frequent because of its location on Delhi-Chandigarh main highway.

Air

Chandigarh International Airport is the nearest airport situated in Mohali 17 km away from the city.

Rail

Chandigarh Junction railway station lies 15 km away from Derabassi via Daria and 27.5 km via ISBT 17. Ambala Cantt railway junction is 31 km away from Derabassi and lies on same Chandigarh-Delhi highway on which Derbassi is situated. Ghaggar railway station is a 132 years old small railway station situated just 4.5 km away from Derabassi mainly operational for MEMU & Passenger trains.

Industries

Derabassi's location at Delhi-Chandigarh highway is suitable for real estate projects. Zirakpur and Derabassi are expanding towards each other which will form a continuous urban belt from Derabassi to Chandigarh. Certain real estate projects are :

ATS Golf Meadows, Motia Chandigarh Hills,Bella Home, Silver City, Chandigarh Apartments, GBP Superia, GBP Business Square, GBP Ultima, GBP Eco Greens, Ubber Golden Palms, Estonia Homez, SBP Housing Park, Leaf Stone Valley, GBP Rosewood Estate, GBP Eco Homes, GBP Astra, Gulmohar City Extension and Parivar Enclave.

Derabassi have a flour mill named as Balaji flour mills on gulabgarh road street no. 02, steel plant of Bhushan Power & Steel (now defunct), Hella India Lightings.Ltd, Molson Coors India (brewery), Nectar Life Sciences.Ltd (pharma), Cepham Milk Specialities.Ltd (dairy products), Federal Agro Industries (meat supplier), Allychem Laboratories (chemicals), Ind Swift.Ltd, Winsom Yarns, TSPL, Punjab Chemicals, KDDL.Ltd, Rajasthan Liquors.Ltd, Cooper Automotives.Ltd, HPL Additives.Ltd, etc. Derbassi have industrial estates/areas at Jawaharpur, Kuranwala and Focal Point housing more than 100 industries.

Educational Institutions
Sri Sukhmani Group of Institutes

Longowal Polytechnic College 

National Dental College & Hospital 

Vidya Jyoti Institute of Higher Education  at Gholu Majra village.

L.M. Thapar School of Business Management  on Derabassi-Barwala Road.

Govt College Derabassi

Hospitals In Dera Bassi 
 Best Hospital- Blessings Multispeciality Hospital, Akali Market, Dera Bassi.

 Indus International Hospital, Derabassi 
 Sri Sukhmani Multi Speciality Hospital, Derabassi
 Civil Hospital, Derabassi
 Apex Dental Care And Implant Centre, Derabassi
 Apna hospital, Dera Bassi
 Ashoka healthcare, Dera Bassi
 National Dental College and Hospital, Gulabgarh Derabassi
 RHV Homeopathic Polyclinic, Barwala road. Dera bassi

See also 

 Amlala
 Chandigarh capital region
 Mohali
 Panchkula
 Ambala Chandigarh Expressway
 Greater Mohali
 Ranbir Rano, television serial set in Dera Bassi

References
2. https://www.nhp.gov.in/hospital/sri-sukhmani-multi-speciality-hospital-derabassi--punjab

Cities and towns in Sahibzada Ajit Singh Nagar district